WCKK (96.7 FM, "Kicks 96") is an American radio station licensed to serve Walnut Grove, Mississippi. The station's broadcast license is held by Boswell Media, LLC.

Programming
WCKK broadcasts a country music format.  The morning show, "The Morning House Party," features Eric Matthews, Lora Beckham, and news with Dave Ingram.  Kicks 96 can be heard from Starkville to Jackson and from Winona to Meridian. Eric Matthews left the Morning House Party after a successful 13 years with WCKK moving back to his hometown of Elyria, Ohio.  Award winning Mississippi newscaster Dave Ingram died in 2016.
Stance Bingham, a 30-year radio veteran, became the new host of "The Morning House Party" in July 2017. The new show line-up features news with Mina Mooney, "Minute with the Mayor" segment with Philadelphia, MS Mayor James Young, and live updates with WTOK-TV Philadelphia Bureau Reporter Ashleigh Fortenberry.

History
In October 2009, Johnny Boswell Radio, LLC applied to the Federal Communications Commission (FCC) for a construction permit for a new broadcast radio station. The FCC granted this permit on November 16, 2010, with a scheduled expiration date of November 16, 2013. The new station was assigned call sign "WCKK" on December 3, 2010. After construction and testing were completed in June 2011, the station was granted its broadcast license on November 30, 2011.

References

External links
WCKK official website

CKK
Country radio stations in the United States
Radio stations established in 2011
Leake County, Mississippi
2011 establishments in Mississippi